Hartlepool United Football Club is an English association football club based in the town of Hartlepool, County Durham. The club was founded in 1908, and its first team played in the North-Eastern League from then until 1921, when the Football League formed a new Third Division based in the north of England. Hartlepool have never played above the third tier of English football, nor have they won a divisional title, but they remained a member of the Football League for 89 consecutive seasons before returning to non-league football in 2017. They hold the record for applications for re-election, with fourteenthree to the Third Division North and a divisional record eleven to the Fourth Divisionand all fourteen were successful. Their highest league placing was second in the Third Division North in 1956–57only the champions were promotedbut a year later, they were placed in the Fourth Division when the regionalised third tiers were merged into nationwide third and fourth tiers. Since that restructure, their highest league finish has been sixth in the third tier, in 2003–04 and 2004–05; on the latter occasion, they reached the play-off final but lost out to Sheffield Wednesday. They were relegated from the Football League for the first time in 2016–17. They reached the last 32 of the FA Cup for the first time in 1954–55, and have matched that performance six times since, most recently in 2021–22. In the Football League Cup, their best performance was to reach the last 16 in 1975–76.

History
After West Hartlepool R.F.C. folded in 1908, a professional association football club was founded to play at their ground; the board of directors, which included former members of the rugby club committee, named the club Hartlepools United, with the aim of attracting spectators not only from West Hartlepool but also from the nearby town of Hartlepool. In their first season, they won the major regional trophy, the Durham Challenge Cupand retained it the following yearas well as entering the FA Cup, in which they were drawn to play the local amateur club, West Hartlepool F.C., with whom they shared the Victoria Ground. Hartlepool won 2–1 in the first qualifying round only to go out in the second, beaten by South Bank after a replay. They also entered the North-Eastern League, finished fourth in their initial season, and remained members of that league until 1920–21; their best season was 1910–11, when they finished third. In 1921, the Football League agreed to form a Northern Section of the Third Division to complement the existing Third Division which contained only southern-based teams. Hartlepool were among the 18 applicants accepted as members, and began their Football League career with a fourth-place finish in the 1921–22 season.

Two seasons later, Hartlepool came 21st in the table, so were obliged to apply for re-election to the League; they and bottom club Barrow were elected unopposed. In the 1935–36 season, the club reached the third round of the FA Cup for the first time. Drawn against Grimsby Town, they held the First Division club to a goalless draw despite playing most of the match with forward Dick Hardy replacing the concussed Jackie Mittell in goal, but lost the replay. By the time the Second World War put a temporary end to competitive football, they had spent 18 consecutive seasons in the Northern Section, courtesy of two more successful applications for re-election.

In the mid-1950s, Hartlepool enjoyed improved performances in both league and cup competition. In the FA Cup, they reached the fourth round for the first time in 1954–55, losing to Nottingham Forest in a replay after extra time. The following season, they lost 1–0 to reigning League champions Chelsea in the third round, and at the same stage of the 1956–57 competition, in front of a record Victoria Ground attendance of 17,426, they came back from 3–0 down with top scorer Ken Johnson struggling with injury to equalise against Manchester United's "Busby Babes" before the top-flight club found a late winner. Those three league seasons brought top-six finishes, culminating in what remains the club's record high of second place in 1956–57only the champions were promoted. They dropped into the bottom six in 1958, which meant they were placed in the Fourth Division when the regional sections were merged into nationwide third and fourth tiers. Hartlepool did not fare well in the fourth tier. After five consecutive applications for re-election and with the club in financial difficulties, they appointed the 30-year-old Brian Clough in October 1965 to his first managerial role. He and assistant Peter Taylor, aided by a change of chairmanship, built a team that finished eighth in 1966–67. Although Clough and Taylor then left for Derby County, the team maintained their form, finished third, and won promotion for the first time in the club's history in 1967–68. To better represent the new borough formed by the recent amalgamation of the adjacent boroughs of Hartlepool and West Hartlepool, the board decided the club needed a new name.

Hartlepool Association Football Club's foray into the Third Division lasted just one season, and after nine years, three re-elections and a £10,000 loan from the local council to keep the club afloat, the name was changed again, to Hartlepool United. In 1977–78, the first season under that name, the team reached the fourth round of the FA Cup again; despite progressing to the same stage five times since, most recently in 2021–22, they have yet to play in the fifth round. By the time automatic promotion and relegation between the Football Conference and the League was introduced in 1986–87, Hartlepool had made a record eleven applications for re-election to the Fourth Division, which added to the three in the pre-war Northern Section made fourteen, also a league record, all of which had been successful. They remained in the fourth tier until Joe Allon's 28 goals helped them gain promotion via a third-place finish. This time their stay lasted three seasons.

Three consecutive defeats in the semi-finals of the play-offs preceded promotion as 2002–03 Third Division runners-upwhen the Premier League broke away in 1992, the Football League's divisions were renumbered upwards. Hartlepool then achieved their highest finishing position since the introduction of the four-division structure, coming sixth in the third tier in both 2003–04 and 2004–05. On the latter occasion, they reached the play-off final but lost out to Sheffield Wednesday. Relegated in 2006, they bounced straight back as runners-up in what was by then League Two, and spent six years at the higher level. They came close to automatic relegation in 2014–15, but two years later, they were relegated from the Football League for the first time after a continuous membership of 89 playing seasons. Needing to win their final match of the season and hope Newport County did not, Hartlepool came from behind to beat title-chasing Doncaster Rovers but Newport produced an 89th-minute winner to secure their own safety at Hartlepool's expense. After four years, they returned to the Football League via the play-offs.

Since their admission to the Football League in 1921, the team have spent 43 seasons in the third tier of the English football league system, 47 in the fourth, and 4 in non-league football. The table details the team's achievements and the top goalscorer in senior first-team competitions from their debut season in the North-Eastern League and FA Cup in 1908–09 to the end of the most recently completed season.

Key

Key to league record:
P – Played
W – Games won
D – Games drawn
L – Games lost
F – Goals for
A – Goals against
Pts – Points
Pos – Final position
Key to colours and symbols:

Key to divisions:
NEL – North Eastern League
Div 3N – Football League Third Division North
Div 3 – Football League Third Division
Div 4 – Football League Fourth Division
League 1 – Football League One
League 2 – Football League Two, EFL League Two
National – National League

Key to stages of competitions:
Group – Group stage
Prelim – Preliminary round
QR1 – First qualifying round
QR2 – Second qualifying round, etc.
R1 – First round, etc.
R2 – Second round, etc.
QF – Quarter-final
SF – Semi-final
F – Runners-up
W – Winners
(N) – Northern section of regionalised stage

Details of the abandoned 1939–40 Football League season are shown in italics and appropriately footnoted.

Seasons

Notes

References

Sources

External links
Hartlepool United F.C. official website

 
Hartlepool United